George Henning "Sonny" Franck (September 23, 1918 – January 19, 2011) was an American football halfback who played in the National Football League (NFL) for the New York Giants.

Early years
Franck was born in Davenport, Iowa. After his playing years and early teaching and coaching career he returned to nearby Rock Island, Illinois.

Franck played college football at the University of Minnesota from 1938-1940, where he was a key player in the dominant national championship team of 1940. While in college Franck was a member of Phi Delta Theta fraternity. He was drafted in the first round (sixth overall) in the 1941 NFL Draft.  Franck was inducted into the College Football Hall of Fame in 2002.

War service
After the attack on Pearl Harbor, Franck joined the United States Marines Corps and served as pilot. He was a spotter during the Battle of Iwo Jima, and he saw Notre Dame football star Jack Chevigny taking cover in a crater shortly before Chevigny was killed in action.

Post-war
After the war, he continued to play with the Giants from 1945 to 1947. He eventually became a high school teacher and coach in Oklahoma City and then Rock Island High School in Illinois. He was a member of Broadway Presbyterian Church and enjoyed bowling. He was survived by Helen, his wife of 57 years. He bought and lived in the Shields House in Highland Park Historic District in Rock Island, IL., which is now owned by Filipino-American author, Jason Tanamor.

References

External links
 
 

1918 births
2011 deaths
American football halfbacks
Corpus Christi Naval Air Station Comets football players
Minnesota Golden Gophers football players
New York Giants players
High school football coaches in Illinois
High school football coaches in Oklahoma
All-American college football players
College Football Hall of Fame inductees
United States Marine Corps pilots of World War II
United States Marine Corps officers
Sportspeople from Davenport, Iowa
Players of American football from Iowa
American Presbyterians
Military personnel from Iowa